The Other Truth is a 2011 television legal drama serial set and filmed in Hong Kong. Produced by Television Broadcasts Limited (TVB), Amy Wong serves as the drama's executive producer with Kwan Chung-ling as the head writer. The Other Truth premiered on 27 June 2011, airing five days a week at 9:30 pm (HKT) on the TVB Jade and TVB HD Jade channels in Hong Kong. A total of 25 episodes were produced.

The drama revolves around a group of young barristers and solicitors working in Clayton Hau Chamber and Wallace Cheuk & Co. Solicitors, two fictional law firms in Central, Hong Kong. The Other Truth focuses on ambiguous criminal and civil cases with disputable truths, highlighting the lawyers' strive for impartiality and blind justice. The criminals and victims often play prominent roles in their episodes.

List of court cases

Patricide (弒父): Episodes 1–3
Case type: Criminal
Prosecutor: Government of Hong Kong
Defendant: Ho Wai-chung
Charges: Murder
Prosecution Counsel: Barrister Man of the Department of Justice
Defendant Counsel: Barrister Keith Lau
Fong Siu-lan (Louise Lee) has been under the psychological torment of her abusive husband Ho King-wai (Wong Ching) for many years. She tries filing a complaint against her husband for domestic violence, but loses the court case. In order to escape Wai's wrath, Lan and her son Ho Wai-chung (Brian Chu) move out of their apartment. Wai follows Chung to school, resulting in Chung to often skip school to evade his father. One day, Wai violently attacks Lan and forcefully takes nude pictures of her, threatening her to stay. To protect his mother, Chung kills his father.

Uncle Files an Appeal (阿伯要上訴): Episodes 5–7
Case type: Civil
Prosecutor: Government of Hong Kong
Defendant: Tam Wai-tung
Charges: Illegal employment
Prosecution Counsel: Unknown
Defendant counsel: Barrister James Wai
Tam Wai-tung (Benz Hui) is put to seven days in jail for hiring an illegal worker. After finishing his sentence, he files an appeal, claiming that he is innocent.

A Star's Rape Case (阿星強姦案): Episodes 8–10
Case type: Criminal
Prosecutor: Government of Hong Kong
Defendant Counsel: Barrister Gill
Charges: Rape
Prosecution counsel:Barrister Mavis Hong
Rising television actress Iris Wong (Aimee Chan) is raped by Manpreet Chima (Bitto), an Indian Hong Kong resident. A jury of seven different individuals, including James' mother Lai (Angelina Lo), carefully discuss the guilt or innocence of the defendant on the basis of reasonable doubt. TVB received six complains of racial discrimination from audience members about the use of the anti-South Asian slur "Ah Cha" in the show's dialogue.

Duplicitous Mother (蛇心慈母): Episodes 11–16
Cheng Suk-kuen (Helen Ma), Keith's mother, was accused by Tsui Yuen-mei (Rosanne Lui) of attempted murder. Cheng's charge was dismissed finally and Tsui later committed suicide. Ivy (Leanne Li), Tsui's daughter and Keith's half-sister, retaliated on Cheng for her mother's death.

Kill the Cop (殺警): Episodes 16–19
Police Chief Inspector Yam Kwok-chu (Felix Lok) and his subordinates were bribed by a triad leader Lam Chau (Wong Chun-tong). In order not to disclose their crimes, Turkey (Daniel Kwok), one of Yam's subordinates, killed police officer Tam Wai-chiu (Au Siu-wai) and drug trafficker Chiu Wai-kong (Billy Kong), and imputed the murder to Chiu and another trafficker Ben Wong (Matt Yeung). Wallace was a witness of the murder.

Collecting Debts (收數): Episodes 21–25
Alex Kong (Kenneth Ma) is an accountant and develops a relationship with Cecilia. Alex has a close relationship with Brother Lui - a triad boss. Brother Lui passes away, and the police charges Alex and Short Kan - one of the men under brother Lui, for being involved on planning a murder of another triad boss. Cecilia turns to Keith to become Alex's lawyer, and claims he's innocent. After all the relevant evidence that proves Alex's innocence, Cecilia discovers small clues that show that Alex is guilty. Nothing could be done to get Alex into jail. Hence, Alex is released from custody. However, Cecilia breaks up with Alex.

Cecilia later finds out the story has not ended, and her life ends in tragedy. Keith, Mavis, and Wallace start to collect evidence of Alex's illegal deals with Window. Mavis holds the USB with all the evidence to get Window and Alex in jail. Alex arranges a burglary for the chamber. Alex fails to find the USB, he then leads Keith and Wallace into following Window and Alex to a nearby alley and get kidnapped.

Minor cases
The armed burglary case (Episode 1)
An armed police officer is accused of robbery. Features Keith Lau as the Defendant Counsel.
The showroom toilet case (Episode 1)
Michael (Brian Burrell), Mavis Hong's ex-husband, mistook a restroom showroom exhibition as an actual restroom and is charged with destruction of property. Features Mavis Hong as the Defendant Counsel.
Prenuptial agreement case (Episode 2)
Emily Yu (Mandy Lam) files suit against her fiancé Peter Leung (Ko Chun-man) for violating their prenuptial agreements. Features Mavis Hong as the Defendant Counsel.
Forged document case (Episode 3)
Mary Yu (Jess Sum) files a complaint against her friend Chow Chi-ching (Candy Cheung) for forging a trust fund document. Features Wallace Cheuk as the Defendant Counsel.
In Love with My Teacher (Episode 4)
A high school student Cheung Wing-shan (Cilla Kung) falls in love with her teacher Chu Wing-fai (Cheung Tat-lun), who is being charged with raping her. Features Mavis Hong as the Prosecution Counsel.
Medical malpractice (Episode 5)
Siu Man-wai (Rebecca Chan), a doctor and Wallace's mother, is being sued by Ma Wing-fu (Wilson Tsui) for medical malpractice in the matter of Mrs. Ma's death. Features Wallace Cheuk as the Defendant Counsel.
Watch company corruption (Episode 5–7)
Ma Wing-choi (Cheng Shu-fung) and Cheuk Kai-hong (Chun Wong) are charged with corruption by ICAC. The case was reported by Ma Wing-fu, Ma Wing-choi's brother, who wants to take over Ma Wing-choi's watch company business. Features Wallace Cheuk as the Defendant Counsel.
Bar wounding assault (Episode 8–11)
Michael, Mavis Hong's ex-husband, was accused of injuring Paula in a bar.
Serial robberies (Episode 11–12)
Ho Lik-kei was accused as another theft who had similar appearance with Ho involved in serial robberies.
Chow Man murder (Episode 17-20)
Siu Fuk (Mak Cheung-ching) and Chow Man (Claire Yiu) decided to divorce, and battle for custody of their two children. Chow Man was later mistakenly killed by Siu Fuk. Features Mavis Hong and Keith Lau as the Defendant Counsel.
Prostitution (Episode 21)
Hung Cham (Yu Tsz-ming), a Chaoshanese who could only speak Chaoshan dialect, was mistakenly arrested by a policewoman Lee Miu-yee (Kristal Tin) for prostitution. Features James Wai as the Defendant Counsel.

List of episodes

See also
The Other Truth
List of The Other Truth characters

References

External links
The Other Truth at TVB.com

Lists of Chinese drama television series episodes